In mathematics, an n-group, or n-dimensional higher group, is a special kind of n-category that generalises the concept of group to higher-dimensional algebra.  Here,  may be any natural number or infinity. The thesis of Alexander Grothendieck's student Hoàng Xuân Sính was an in-depth study of 2-groups under the moniker 'gr-category'.

The general definition of -group is a matter of ongoing research.

Examples

Eilenberg-Maclane spaces 
One of the principal examples of higher groups come from the homotopy types of Eilenberg–MacLane spaces  since they are the fundamental building blocks for constructing higher groups, and homotopy types in general. For instance, every group  can be turned into an Eilenberg-Maclane space  through a simplicial construction, and it behaves functorially. This construction gives an equivalence between groups and 1-groups.

2-groups 

The definition and many properties of 2-groups are already known. 2-groups can be described using crossed modules and their classifying spaces. Essentially, these are given by a quadruple  where  are groups with  abelian,a group morphism, and  a cohomology class.

3-groups 
Another interesting and accessible class of examples which requires homotopy theoretic methods, not accessible to strict groupoids, comes from looking at homotopy 3-types of groups. Essential, these are given by a triple of groups  with only the first group being non-abelian, and some additional homotopy theoretic data from the Postnikov tower. If we take this 3-group as a homotopy 3-type , the existence of universal covers gives us a homotopy type  which fits into a fibration sequencegiving a homotopy  type with  trivial on which  acts on. These can be understood explicitly using the previous model of -groups, shifted up by degree (called delooping). Then,  can be reconstructed using a homotopy quotient .

n-groups 
The previous construction gives the general idea of how to consider higher groups in general. For an n group with groups  with the latter bunch being abelian, we can consider the associated homotopy type  and first consider the universal cover . Then, this is a space with trivial , making it easier to construct the rest of the homotopy type using the postnikov tower. This observation is reflected in the fact that homotopy types are not realized by simplicial groups, but simplicial groupoidspg 295 since the groupoid structure models the homotopy quotient .

Going through the construction of a 4-group  is instructive because it gives the general idea for how to construct the groups in general. This gives a postnikov towerwhere the first non-trivial map  is a fibration with fiber . In principal this cohomology group should be computable using the previous fibration  with the Serre spectral sequence with the correct coefficients, namely . Doing this recursively, say for a -group, would require several spectral sequence computations, at worse  many spectral sequence computations for an -group.

n-groups from sheaf cohomology 
This is particularly applicable for complex tori.

See also 

 ∞-groupoid
 Crossed module
 Homotopy hypothesis
Abelian 2-group

References 

 Hoàng Xuân Sính, Gr-catégories, PhD thesis, (1973)

Algebraic models for homotopy n-types 

 
 
 - musings by Tim porter discussing the pitfalls of modelling homotopy n-types with n-cubes

Cohomology of higher groups

Cohomology of higher groups over a site 
Note this is (slightly) distinct from the previous section, because it is about taking cohomology over a space  with values in a higher group , giving higher cohomology groups . If we are considering  as a homotopy type and assuming the homotopy hypothesis, then these are the same cohomology groups.

Group theory
Higher category theory
Homotopy theory